Lyudmila Dideleva (born 23 December 1976) is a Belarusian cross-country skier. She competed in three events at the 1994 Winter Olympics.

References

External links
 

1976 births
Living people
Belarusian female cross-country skiers
Olympic cross-country skiers of Belarus
Cross-country skiers at the 1994 Winter Olympics
Sportspeople from Vitebsk